Madhopur  is a village in Phagwara tehsil in Kapurthala district of Punjab State, India. The village is administrated by a Sarpanch who is an elected representative.

Transport 
Phagwara, Jandiala, Jalandhar, and Kartarpur are the nearby cities.

References

External links 
  Villages in Kapurthala
 Kapurthala Villages List

Villages in Kapurthala district